Dolna Mitropoliya Municipality is a municipality (obshtina) in Pleven Province, Northern Bulgaria. The administrative centre of the area is the homonymous town of Dolna Mitropoliya.

The northern boundary of the municipality is the Danube River, and the 10,926 hectare Natura 2000 Reka Vit Special Protection Area for preservation of avian habitat is located there.

Settlements 

(towns are shown in bold):

Demography 
The following table shows the change of the population during the last four decades. Since 1992 Dolna Mitropoliya Municipality has comprised the former municipality of Podem and the numbers in the table reflect this unification.

Religion 
According to the latest Bulgarian census of 2011, the religious composition, among those who answered the optional question on religious identification, was the following:

See also
Provinces of Bulgaria
Municipalities of Bulgaria
List of cities and towns in Bulgaria

References

Municipalities in Pleven Province